Stone Soup: An Old Tale is a 1947 picture book written and illustrated by Marcia Brown and published by Charles Scribner's Sons. It is a retelling of the Stone Soup folk tale. Three soldiers make a soup using water and stones. Each villager contributes an ingredient to the soup, creating a feast. The book was a recipient of a 1948 Caldecott Honor for its illustrations.

Adaptations
Weston Woods produced a cartoon of this book in 1992, narrated by Rex Robbins.

References

1947 children's books
American picture books
Caldecott Honor-winning works
Charles Scribner's Sons